State Trunk Highway 96 (often called Highway 96, STH-96 or WIS 96) is a state highway in the U.S. state of Wisconsin. It runs east–west in east-central Wisconsin from near Fremont to Denmark.

Route description
Starting at US 10 (exit 267) interchange, WIS 96 and WIS 110 begin to travel northward from CTH-II as a four-lane divided road. Shortly after that, WIS 96 turns east as a two-lane undivided road while WIS 110 turns west. Going east, WIS 96 meets Readfield, US 45 at a roundabout, Dale, and Medina. Then, it meets WIS 76 just northwest of the Appleton International Airport. Then, it meets I-41/US 41 at a diamond interchange. In Appleton, it then meets WIS 47. Just at the eastern city limit, it then passes under WIS 441 north of the Fox River.

At this point, WIS 96 parallels the Fox River. The route then travels through Little Chute, Kaukauna, and Wrightstown. Past Wrightstown, the route no longer parallels the Fox River. In Greenleaf, the route intersects with WIS 32. Between Lark and Shirley, WIS 96 travels northward. Then, it travels eastward to Denmark. At the village limit of Denmark, WIS 96 ends at I-43 at a diamond interchange.

Major intersections

See also

References

External links

STH-96 at Wisconsin Highways

096
Transportation in Waupaca County, Wisconsin
Transportation in Outagamie County, Wisconsin
Transportation in Brown County, Wisconsin